Roman Yaroslavovych Zakharkiv (born 24 January 1991 in Lviv, Ukraine) is a Ukrainian luger who has competed since 2005. He participated at 2010, 2014 and 2018 Winter Olympics.

Career
Zakharkiv has competed at international level since 2007 with Taras Senkiv. He qualified for the 2010 Winter Olympics where he finished 19th in doubles event. After 2010–11 season he missed two years. During his absence he changed his partner. Since then he competes with Oleksandr Obolonchyk.

Zakharkiv competed at the 2014 Winter Olympics for Ukraine. In the doubles he was 17th. He was also a part of the Ukrainian relay team, which finished 11th.

After 2014 Olympics he became one of Ukrainian national team leaders and since then he participates in all major competitions. He participated in doubles and relay competitions at three World Championships without any great success.

As of January 2018, his best finish is 13th place in Sigulda, Latvia, in 2016-17 season.

On 27 December 2017 Roman Zakharkiv qualified for 2018 Winter Olympics. At that Games he competed together with Oleksandr Obolonchyk and finished 20th in doubles competition and 13th in team relay.

Personal life
Zakharkiv graduated from Lviv State University of Physical Culture.

Career results

Winter Olympics

World Championships

European Championships

Luge World Cup

Rankings

References

External links
 
 
 

1991 births
Living people
Ukrainian male lugers
Olympic lugers of Ukraine
Lugers at the 2010 Winter Olympics
Lugers at the 2014 Winter Olympics
Lugers at the 2018 Winter Olympics
Sportspeople from Lviv